Tritoniella is a genus of sea slugs, specifically dendronotid nudibranchs. It is a marine gastropod mollusc in the family Tritoniidae.The genus was described in 1907 by the British diplomat and malacologist Charles Eliot.

Description
Tritoniella can be differentiated from Tritonia (the only other Tritoniidae sharing its distribution range) by a wide dorsal ridge and lack of foliaceous tufts (gills).

Most individuals have a ridge running along the middle of the back. The colour is variable, ranging from a translucent milky white to yellow or orange.

Distribution

Ecology
Tritoniella feeds mainly on soft corals, but may also feed on hydroids and sea anemones.

Tritoniella belli incorporates the chimyl alcohol ingested from Clavularia frankliniana into its tissue to use it as a chemical defence to make itself upalatable against predators.

It is avoided by the predatory starfishes Odontaster validus, Perknaster fuscus and Acodontaster conspicuus because the mucus it extrudes is distasteful; it is preyed on by the sea anemone Isotealia antarctica, but 70% of the encounters between the two result in the nudibranch escaping, or the sea anemone swallowing the nudibranch but then regurgitating it from its gastrovascular cavity. The gelatinous egg ribbons of the nudibranch are also eaten by I. antarctica but rejected by O. validus.

References

Tritoniidae
Fauna of the Atlantic Ocean
Fauna of the Southern Ocean